Efrat Gosh (born 1983) is an Israeli singer-songwriter.

Biography
Efrat Gosh was born in Herzliya. She studied in the music department of Alon high school in Ramat Hasharon. She continued her education at the Rimon School of Jazz and Contemporary Music, focusing on Jazz. She cites Billie Holiday, Edith Piaf, Louis Armstrong and Charlie Parker as musical influences.

Music career

Gosh's music career began when she recorded a demo with Yoni Bloch of a song written for Nurit Galron. A week later, she was asked to sing backing vocals in Bloch's shows. The head of the Hebrew Department of the Israeli music label NMC at the time, Chaim Shemesh, was in the audience and signed a contract with her.

In 2009, Gosh was the voice of Zoe Drake in the Anime Series Dinosaur King and Foofa in Yo Gabba Gabba!. She also dubbed Once Upon a Time... Planet Earth.

Discography
 2005 Efrat Gosh «Efrat Gosh»
 2007 The Forgiveness and me «Ha-slicha ve-ani»
 2010 Ah ah ah love «Ah ah ah ahava»

See also
Music in Israel

References

External links
Efrat Gosh on MySpace
Chaim Shemesh Official Website

1983 births
Living people
21st-century Israeli women singers
People from Herzliya